Ma On Kong is a village in Pat Heung, Yuen Long District, Hong Kong.

Administration
Ma On Kong is a recognized village under the New Territories Small House Policy. It is one of the villages represented within the Pat Heung Rural Committee. For electoral purposes, Ma On Kong is part of the Pat Heung South constituency, which is currently represented by Lai Wing-tim.

See also
 Tai Lam Tunnel
 Ho Pui and Tai Kek, two nearby villages

References

External links

 Delineation of area of existing village Ma On Kong Tsuen (Pat Heung) for election of resident representative (2019 to 2022)

Villages in Yuen Long District, Hong Kong
Pat Heung